The Department of Tourism and Leisure was a department of the Isle of Man Government.

History
The department was created in 1986 as the Department of Tourism and Transport.

With the addition of extra responsibilities in 1990 the department was renamed the Department of Tourism, Leisure and Transport. In 1994 there was a departmental reorganisation. The Department of Highways Ports and Properties and the Department of Tourism, Leisure and Transport became the Department of Tourism and Leisure and the Department of Transport.

In 2010, the department was split up and Tourism function went to the Department of Economic Development and Leisure to Department of Community, Culture and Leisure.

Ministers/Chairmen with Tourism Responsibility

Ministers for Economic Development
John Shimmin, 2011–present
Allan Bell MHK, 2010–2011

Ministers for Tourism and Leisure
Martyn Quayle MHK, 2008–2010
Adrian Earnshaw MHK, 2006–2008
David Cretney MHK, 1996–2006
Tony Brown MHK, 1994–1996

Ministers of Tourism, Leisure and Transport
Allan Bell MHK, 1990–1994

Ministers of Tourism and Transport
Allan Bell MHK, 1986–1990

Chairmen of the Tourist Board
Edmund Lowey, 1981–1986
Clifford Irving, 1971–1981
William E. Quayle, 1962–1971
James Cain, 1960–1962
unknown, 1952–1962

Chairmen of the Publicity Board
unknown, 1931–1952

Chairmen of the Advertising Board
Edward Callister, 1929–1930
Samuel Norris, 1924–1929
J R Kerruish, 1920–1924
unknown, 1904–1920

Chairmen of the Advertising Committee
unknown, ?-1904

Government of the Isle of Man
Tourism in the Isle of Man
Tourism ministries